Rotter or Rotters may refer to:

People

Surname
Ariel Rotter (born 1973), Argentine film director and screenwriter
Elizabeth Neff Walker, a pen name of Elizabeth Rotter, American writer of romance novels
Emília Rotter (1906-2003), Hungarian pairs figure skater
Jeffrey Rotter, American writer
Jerzy Rzedowski Rotter (born 1926), Polish-born Mexican botanist
Julian Rotter (1916-2014), American psychologist
Lajos Rotter (1901-1983), Hungarian engineer, pilot and aircraft designer - see Rotter Karakán 
Oscar Rotter (1865-?), German-born New York physician and proponent of free love and contraception
Rudy Rotter (1913–2001), American artist
Stephen A. Rotter, film editor

Stage name
Faris Badwan (born 1986), also known as Faris Rotter, English musician, former member of the pseudo-punk band The Rotters

Fictional characters
Junior Rotter, from the British comic strips Whizzer and Chips and Buster
Mr. Rotter, a character from Wheel Squad
Rotter, a recurring character in the British animated television programme Foxbusters
Rotters, one name for reanimated dead people in The Walking Dead (franchise)

Films
The Rotters, a 1921 British comedy